Lisa Godbey Wood (born January 28, 1963) is a United States district judge of the United States District Court for the Southern District of Georgia.

Education and career

Born in Lexington, Kentucky, Wood received a Bachelor of Arts degree from the University of Georgia in 1985 and a Juris Doctor from the University of Georgia School of Law in 1990.

From 1985 to 1986 she was the press secretary and later campaign advisor for Georgia Congressman Pat Swindall. From 1986 to 1987 she was a consultant to the Educational Improvement Project. In 1987 she was a career trainee for the Central Intelligence Agency. From 1988 to 1989 she was a summer law clerk for three different law firms. In 1989 she was a teaching assistant at the University of Georgia Business School.

She was a law clerk for Judge  Anthony Alaimo of the United States District Court for the Southern District of Georgia in 1990. She was in private practice in Brunswick, Georgia from 1991 to 2004. She was a Magistrate judge (part-time), Glynn County Magistrate Court, Georgia from 1998 to 2000. She was the United States Attorney for the Southern District of Georgia from 2004 to 2007.

Federal judicial service

Wood is a United States District Judge of the United States District Court for the Southern District of Georgia. Wood was nominated by President George W. Bush on January 9, 2007, to a seat vacated by Dudley Hollingsworth Bowen Jr. She was confirmed by the United States Senate on January 30, 2007, and received her commission on February 8, 2007. She served as Chief Judge from 2010 to 2017. When Wood was appointed, she became the first woman ever to serve as Chief Judge for the Southern District of Georgia.

References

External links

1963 births
Living people
Georgia (U.S. state) state court judges
Judges of the United States District Court for the Southern District of Georgia
People from Lexington, Kentucky
United States Attorneys for the Southern District of Georgia
United States district court judges appointed by George W. Bush
21st-century American judges
University of Georgia alumni
Georgia (U.S. state) Republicans
University of Georgia School of Law alumni
Kentucky women in politics
21st-century American women judges